Portlockiellidae is an extinct family of gastropods in the clade Vetigastropoda (according to the taxonomy of the Gastropoda by Bouchet & Rocroi, 2005).

This family has no subfamilies.

Genera 
Genera within the family Portlockiellidae include:
 Portlockiella Knight, 1945 - the type genus
 Agniesella
 Hammatospira
 Nodonema
 Shansiella = Latischisma
 Tapinotomaria

References